
Year 28 BC was either a common year starting on Saturday, Sunday or Monday or a leap year starting on Saturday or Sunday (link will display the full calendar) of the Julian calendar (the sources differ, see leap year error for further information) and a common year starting on Saturday of the Proleptic Julian calendar. At the time, it was known as the Year of the First Consulship of Octavian and Agrippa (or, less frequently, year 726 Ab urbe condita). The denomination 28 BC for this year has been used since the early medieval period, when the Anno Domini calendar era became the prevalent method in Europe for naming years.

Events 
 By place 

 Roman Republic 
 Gaius Julius Caesar Octavian becomes Roman Consul for the sixth time. His partner Marcus Vipsanius Agrippa becomes Consul for the second time.
 The Roman Senate grants Octavian Caesar the title imperium maius (supreme commander) of the Roman armed forces (Around 60 legions).
 Augustus initiates a census of the Roman Republic for the first time since 69 BC.

 By topic 

 Astronomy 
 May 10 – The earliest dated record of a sunspot by Chinese astronomers.

Births

Deaths 
 Alexandra the Maccabee, Hasmonean princess (approximate date)
 Mariamne I, Hasmonean princess and wife Herod the Great (or 29 BC)

References